Double Vision was a Spanish Euro Dance duo, consisting of Carol McCloskey and DJ Pedro Cervero. They were successful mostly in Germany, Austria, Belgium, Netherlands and Switzerland with their songs with catchy lyrics with techno beats.

After initial success in Spain, Double Vision's single "Knockin'" released in 1995 enjoyed big popularity in Germany reaching Top 5 in German, Dutch and Belgian Singles Chart and a Top 10 hit in the Swiss charts in addition to topping the Austrian Singles Chart for 7 consecutive weeks. The follow up single "All Right" charted in Germany and Austria.

Discography

Albums

Singles

Others
 1993: "Sara"
 1993: "Honey Be Good"
 1993: "Unsafe Building"
 1998: "Money"
 1998: "Knockin' (Rmx 2000)"
 1999: "Love Me Now"
 2012: "Knockin' 2012" (Online)

References

Spanish dance music groups